Aikaterini Kotroni (born 12 July 1963) is a Greek sports shooter. She competed in the women's 10 metre air rifle event at the 1992 Summer Olympics.

References

1963 births
Living people
Greek female sport shooters
Olympic shooters of Greece
Shooters at the 1992 Summer Olympics
People from Agios Nikolaos, Crete
Sportspeople from Crete
20th-century Greek women